Winners is an album by American singer Bobby Darin, released in 1964, two years after Bobby had left ATCO (who released Winners) and moved to Capitol.

Most of the album was recorded in February 1960, with arrangements by Bobby Scott.  This was Darin's only vocal jazz album using a small combo rather than an orchestra or big band.  Twelve songs were released on the album, but more were recorded at the sessions: "Bill Bailey Won't You Please Come Home" was released as a single in 1960, "Swing Low Sweet Chariot" was released as a single in 1964, and "Minnie the Moocher" was released on a single in 1965.  "Swing Low Sweet Chariot" has never been reissued on either LP or CD.  Two other songs, "I Got a Woman" and "A Game of Poker" (from the musical Saratoga), remain unreleased.

Two songs on the album do not fit the jazz combo theme and were not recorded at the same time as the other tracks.  "Golden Earrings" (from the film of the same name) was recorded on March 25, 1961, and "Milord" had been recorded (in French) on June 20, 1960.  They had been released as both sides of a single a few months before Winners was issued in 1964.

Reception

Winners received relatively little fanfare when released.   Billboard referred to it as "romantic and sentimental ballads and up-tempo swingers aimed at the sophisticated set."  Cash Box stated the album was a group of "Darin-fashioned ballads and uptempo pleasers."

In his Allmusic review, critic Lindsay Planer wrote “In typical Darin style, he turns in thoroughly captivating readings. Granted, there are few (if any) plateaus… ”Easy Living" is perhaps the most emotive and exquisite cut on Winners. It is unfathomable to consider that it was initially deemed not worthy of release, as it remained unissued for over two years. The remarkable breadth of Darin's interpretation has rarely been equalled and likewise serves as a personal best.”

Track listing
”Milord” (Marguerite Monnot, Georges Moustaki) – 2:01
”Between the Devil and the Deep Blue Sea” (Harold Arlen, Ted Koehler) – 2:01
”Anything Goes” (Cole Porter) – 2:20
”Do Nothin’ Till You Hear from Me” (Duke Ellington, Bob Russell) – 2:47
”Golden Earrings” (Ray Evans, Jay Livingston, Victor Young) – 2:02
”When Day is Done” (Buddy DeSylva) – 3:40
”I've Found a New Baby” (Jack Palmer, Spencer Williams) – 2:11
”What a Diff'rence a Day Made” (Stanley Adams, María Grever) – 3:36
”What Can I Say After I Say I'm Sorry?” (Walter Donaldson, Abe Lyman) – 3:00
”Hard Hearted Hannah” (Jack Yellen, Milton Ager, Charles Bates, Bob Bigelow) – 2:26
”Easy Living” (Ralph Rainger, Leo Robin) – 2:42
”They All Laughed” (George Gershwin, Ira Gershwin) – 2:15

Personnel
Bobby Darin – vocals
Bobby Scott – piano, arrangements
Howard Roberts – guitar
Larry Bunker – vibraphone
Joe Mondragon – bass guitar
Ronnie Zito – drums
Jack Costanzo, Carlos Vidal – congas

References

1964 albums
Bobby Darin albums
Atco Records albums
Albums produced by Ahmet Ertegun